Elisha Wiesel (born June 6, 1972) is an American businessman, who is chairman of Israeli fintech start-up vendor management firm The Floor. He worked for Goldman Sachs for 25 years, serving as its chief information officer for three years, until December 2019. He is the only child of Holocaust survivor, author, professor, and Nobel Peace Prize recipient Elie Wiesel.

Early and personal life
Shlomo Elisha Wiesel was born in 1972. He was named Shlomo Elisha, after his paternal grandfather, Shlomo, who died at age 50 after a death march to the Buchenwald concentration camp. At his bris, the rabbi said: "A name has returned."

His father, Elie Wiesel, was a Holocaust survivor, author, professor, activist, and Nobel Peace Prize recipient of Hungarian Jewish and Romanian Jewish descent, whose hometown was Sighet, Romania. His mother, Marion Erster Rose Wiesel, is a Holocaust survivor born in Vienna, Austria, of Austrian Jewish descent, who came to the United States shortly after World War II with her family, with the help of HIAS, then known as the Hebrew Immigrant Aid Society. She became a social justice activist and a translator. His paternal grandmother and his father's younger sister were killed in the gas chambers in the Auschwitz concentration camp.

He was raised on the Upper West Side and Upper East Side in Manhattan in New York City, attending Modern Orthodox yeshiva Ramaz on the Upper East Side, and suburban New Jersey. When he was six years old, Wiesel and his family lived in Israel for a few months. His parents spoke French at home. As a teenager, he moved from computer programming of computer games to electric guitar, interested in heavy metal bands such as Iron Maiden and Metallica, but also in the punk band The Ramones.

Wiesel then attended Yale University, graduating with a B.S. in computer science in 1994. At one point in his freshman year, he sported a purple mohawk haircut. After graduating from Yale, he spent a few months doing basic military training in Israel.

Wiesel and his wife Lynn Bartner-Wiesel have two children: a son, Elijah, and a daughter, Shira.

Career
Wiesel joined the J. Aron commodities division of Goldman Sachs in 1994, after the head of J. Aron strats (the code-writers whose computer models and algorithms power the firm's trading desks) convinced him to give up his initial preference of working in the video game industry. At the time, technology was in its earliest days in banking.  At Goldman he worked for Lloyd Blankfein and Gary Cohn, who ended up leading the firm. One day Blankfein criticized him in the lobby of Goldman's headquarters as he arrived on rollerblades, saying: "I’m invested in that head, get a helmet!"

He became a managing director in 2002, and a partner in 2004. Wiesel later served as the chief risk officer of its securities division (which houses Goldman's technology-intensive trading business), and global head of its securities division desk strategists.

In January 2017, when Wiesel was 44 years old, he succeeded R. Martin Chavez as Goldman's chief information officer, overseeing Engineering (the firm's Technology Division and global strategists groups). Wiesel became the highest-ranked of 9,000 Goldman engineers, who accounted for 25% of the firm's total employees. In July 2017, Institutional Investor named him # 10 in the "2017 Tech 40."

In December 2019 Wiesel left Goldman Sachs after a 25-year career at the firm. As he considered his next move, he said he was interested in the intersection of philanthropy and engineering, and was ready to move on from banking. He was considering options that included traveling the world, computer games, and teaching, while intrigued by the health care company that Jeff Bezos, Warren Buffett, and Jamie Dimon were building, and committed to spending more time working on matters relating to his father such as deciding on the disposition of his papers. He volunteered on Michael Bloomberg's presidential campaign, and reflected later that his was the balance Wiesel was looking for in the political spectrum — "people who understood the need for social justice, but also understood that ... the answer is not Marxism." He also began an archive of his father's writings.

In November 2020 Wiesel joined Israeli Tel Aviv-based fintech start-up vendor management firm The Floor, as chairman of its board of directors. The Floor is a software-as-a-service (SaaS) platform that provides software that helps banks better manage their IT operations and internal and external technology integration, making them more efficient, less costly, and less complex.  At The Floor, Wiesel will help the firm expand and partner with more banks and investors.

Philanthropy 
Wiesel organized fundraisers for Good Shepherd Services, a Brooklyn-based after-school program charity that provides support for at-risk youths and their families, at Goldman beginning in 2013. He also became well known for organizing the popular all-night Midnight Madness problem-solving scavenger hunt throughout New York City, popular among Wall Street professionals. It has raised millions of dollars for charitable non-profits.

Political activity
At a November 30, 2016, event at the United States Holocaust Memorial Museum, Wiesel spoke of the need to protect the LGBT community and Israel, which he said was "treated as the world villain simply for making sure that Jews will never again be without a home," and criticized president-elect Donald Trump's policies that dismissed Syrian refugees, Muslims, undocumented immigrants, women, and African Americans. At another event held at the Museum of Jewish Heritage on January 29, 2017, he suggested that protesting against Executive Order 13769 ("Protecting the Nation from Foreign Terrorist Entry into the United States") was part of his father's legacy.

In April 2017, in a speech to the March of the Living program at Auschwitz for Holocaust Remembrance Day, he said that the United States and European countries had not learned the lessons of the Holocaust, because many in those countries had turned away Syrian refugees fleeing chemical warfare. Wiesel added: "Will you stand by when African-Americans have reason to be terrified of a routine traffic stop, when Christians are slaughtered in Egypt because they are labelled infidels, when girls in Chad, Somalia, Afghanistan, and Pakistan are threatened, raped, or shot for pursuing an education, when homosexuality in Iran is a crime that carries the death penalty?"

Wiesel is as of 2020 a board member of the progressive Zionist organization Zioness.

In December 2022, taking a stand together against the increasing instances of racism and antisemitism in the US, Wiesel joined New York City Mayor Eric Adams, Rev. Al Sharpton, Vista Equity Partners CEO and Carnegie Hall Chairman Robert F. Smith, Baptist Minister Conrad Tillard, and World Values Network founder and CEO Rabbi Shmuley Boteach to host 15 Days of Light, celebrating Hanukkah and Kwanzaa in a unifying holiday ceremony at Carnegie Hall.  Wiesel said: "The Wiesel family stands now and will always stand with the Black community against racism and the lingering economic effects of slavery and segregation in this country.  And we are so moved to hear leaders in the Black community like Mayor Adams, Rev Sharpton, and Rev Tillard speak out so strongly against antisemitism."

References

External links
Elisha Wiesel (June 8, 2017). "Lessons from my Father," Jewish Week.
"A conversation between Elisha Wiesel, Chief Information Officer, Goldman Sachs and David Gurlé," Symphony Innovate 2017, October 10, 2017 (video).
Elisha Wiesel (November 5, 2017). "Answering the Call of My Father, Elie Wiesel" (opinion)," Algemeiner.
Elisha Wiesel (October 29, 2018). "How to Respond to the Unspeakable Tragedy in Pittsburgh" (opinion)," Algemeiner.
Elisha Wiesel (May 6, 2019). "After Poway, We Must Unite and Stop the Hatred (opinion)," Algemeiner.
Elisha Wiesel (November 10, 2019). "Scrapping the ‘Dreamers’ programme should be ruled unlawful (opinion)," Financial Times.
"Transforming Moments with Elisha Wiesel and Dr. Eva Fogelman", Museum of Jewish Heritage, October 13, 2020 (video).
Elisha Wiesel (November 9, 2020). "My father Elie Wiesel is invoked daily. So why are we so far from his legacy?", Forward.
"Elisha Wiesel on Spreading Goodness," The David Suissa Podcast, January 22, 2021 (audio).

1972 births
Living people
Activists against antisemitism
American Jews
American expatriates in Israel
Jewish American philanthropists
American activists
American people of Austrian-Jewish descent
American people of Hungarian-Jewish descent
American people of Romanian-Jewish descent
American computer businesspeople
American computer scientists
American anti-racism activists
Chief information officers
Goldman Sachs people
Ramaz School alumni
Yale College alumni
People from the Upper East Side
People from the Upper West Side
American Zionists
21st-century American Jews